Haemulopsis is a genus of marine ray-finned fish, grunts belonging to the family Haemulidae. They are native to the western Atlantic Ocean and, mainly, to the eastern Pacific Ocean.

Species
The currently recognized species in this genus are:
 Haemulopsis axillaris Steindachner, 1869) (yellowstripe grunt)
 Haemulopsis corvinaeformis (Steindachner, 1868) (roughneck grunt)
 Haemulopsis elongatus (Steindachner, 1879) (elongated grunt)
 Haemulopsis leuciscus (Günther, 1864) (raucous grunt)
 Haemulopsis nitidus (Steindachner, 1869) (shining grunt)

All of these apart from H. corvinaeformis, which is found in the western Atlantic Ocean, are found in the eastern Pacific Ocean.

References

Haemulinae